Tiny Beautiful Things is an upcoming American television series set to be broadcast on streaming service Hulu premiering on April 7, 2023. It is based on the Cheryl Strayed book of the same name. It has been adapted by Liz Tigelaar and produced by Best Day Ever Productions, Hello Sunshine,  Millaudon Street Productions, Stay Upstairs, Mayday Productions, and ABC Signature. It is set to star Kathryn Hahn.

Synopsis
The show centers on Clare (Kathryn Hahn), a writer who reluctantly becomes a popular advice columnist during a period of turmoil in her life.

Cast
 Kathryn Hahn as Clare
 Sarah Pidgeon as younger Clare
 Quentin Plair as Danny
 Tanzyn Crawford as Rae
 Merritt Wever as Frankie

Episodes

Production
Cheryl Strayed had discussed adapting her novel Tiny Beautiful Things with Laura Dern and Reese Witherspoon whilst they worked together making the 2014 film Wild, adapted from Strayed’s memoir.

Liz Tigelaar serves as series creator and writer on the project which is being produced by ABC Signature and Hello Sunshine. Tigelaar is also executive producer, alongside Witherspoon, Dern, Lauren Neustadter, Stacey Silverman, Jayme Lemons, Cheryl Strayed, and Kathryn Hahn.

Hahn was revealed to be playing the role of Clare when it was announced for Hulu in June 2022. In August 2022 Sarah Pidgeon and Tanzyn Crawford were added to the cast.

Broadcast
The series is set to be broadcast on Hulu in the United States, Star+ in the Latín America, andDisney+ in international territories and the United Kingdom starting on April 7, 2023.

References

External links

English-language television shows
Hulu original programming
Television series by ABC Studios